Yunohamella yunohamensis is a species of comb-footed spider in the family Theridiidae. The species inhabits the far east of Russia, Korea, and Japan.

References

Theridiidae
Spiders described in 1906
Spiders of Asia